Thioredoxin-related transmembrane protein 1 is a protein that in humans is encoded by the TMX1 gene.

References

Further reading

Endoplasmic reticulum resident proteins